Pat McNamee is a nationalist politician in Northern Ireland. He was elected in the 1998 election to the Northern Ireland Assembly as a Sinn Féin member for Newry & Armagh.

McNamee was educated at St Patrick's College, Armagh, Abbey Grammar School, Newry and at the University of Ulster. McNamee was also a Member of Northern Ireland Forum, 1996–2001 and a Member of Newry and Mourne District Council, 1997–2001.

When Paul Quinn (21) of Cullyhanna was brutally beaten to death by a gang of men wearing balaclavas and overalls in October 2007 Pat McNamee joined the Quinn Support Group to seek justice for his family.

He contributed to a Spotlight programme on BBC in November 2007 and stated that he believed that 'members of the provisional IRA were responsible for Paul Quinn's death

Pat McNamee was a councillor on Newry & Mourne District Council from 1997 to 1998. He was a councillor on Armagh City and District Council from 2001 to 2005. He left Sinn Féin prior to the general election in May 2005, and decided not to stand for Sinn Féin in the local Government Elections in May 2005. He is not currently a member of any political party.

References

1957 births
Living people
Members of the Northern Ireland Forum
Sinn Féin MLAs
Northern Ireland MLAs 1998–2003
Members of Newry and Mourne District Council
Members of Armagh City and District Council
Sinn Féin councillors in Northern Ireland